George Garratt (1882–unknown) was an English footballer who played in the Football League for Aston Villa and West Bromwich Albion and in the Southern League for Crystal Palace, Millwall Athletic and Plymouth Argyle.

References

1882 births
English footballers
Association football forwards
English Football League players
Brierley Hill Alliance F.C. players
Crewe Alexandra F.C. players
Aston Villa F.C. players
Plymouth Argyle F.C. players
West Bromwich Albion F.C. players
Crystal Palace F.C. players
Millwall F.C. players
Kidderminster Harriers F.C. players
Year of death missing